Oreohelix carinifera, common name keeled mountainsnail, is a species of air-breathing land snail, a terrestrial pulmonate gastropod mollusk in the family Oreohelicidae.

Original description 
Oreohelix carinifera was originally described by Henry Augustus Pilsbry in 1912. The type locality is Garrison, Montana, USA.

Pilsbry's original text (the type description) reads as follows:

Distribution 
This species occurs in Montana, USA.

References
This article incorporates public domain text from reference.

Oreohelicidae
Gastropods described in 1912